Temporary Kings is a novel by Anthony Powell, the penultimate in his twelve-volume novel, A Dance to the Music of Time. It was published in 1973 by Heinemann and remains in print as does the rest of the sequence.

Temporary Kings received the W. H. Smith Prize in 1974.

Critical reception
In its review of Temporary Kings in 1973, The Times said the book was an improvement on the previous instalment, Books Do Furnish a Room, which it said 'showed a certain staleness'. It added: "With 11 out of the 12 books in the series now before us, it is possible to speak fairly confidently of the work as a whole. In spite of that air of being our English Proust which has sometimes grated on those who like the French one, Mr Powell is unlikely to imitate the obsessional heightening in late Proust, nor to spring a redemption on us. His nature is to be uniform: there is hardly a ragged edge or an un-calculated incongruity anywhere in this urbane discourse, where the catastrophes are never witnessed, only inferred from scenes in themselves comic. If the new characters have not quite the flavour of the earlier Gileses and Jeavonses, and the range of the social panorama now appears less than it once seemed, the flow of reappearances and transformations is powerful enough to carry the series through that 'Dance to the Music of Time' whose discipline and formal rhythm do recall Poussin, the artist its title invokes: except that it is a great deal more fun."

References

1973 British novels
Novels by Anthony Powell
A Dance to the Music of Time
Fiction set in 1958
Fiction set in 1959
Heinemann (publisher) books